Artyushinskaya is a rural locality (a village) in Osinovskoye Rural Settlement of Vinogradovsky District, Arkhangelsk Oblast, Russia. The population was 25 as of 2010.

Geography 
Artyushinskaya is located 33 km southeast of Bereznik (the district's administrative centre) by road. Morshikhinskaya is the nearest rural locality.

References 

Rural localities in Vinogradovsky District